The 1985–86 SK Rapid Wien season was the 88th season in club history.

Squad

Squad and statistics

Squad statistics

Fixtures and results

League

Cup

Cup Winners' Cup

References

1985-86 Rapid Wien Season
Rapid